Atopomesus pachyodus is a species of fish in the family Characidae endemic to the Rio Negro drainage, Amazon basin. This species is the only member of its genus.

Location 
The home of the Atopomesus pachyodus is the Negro drainage in Brazil.

References

Characidae
Endemic fauna of Brazil
Fish of Brazil
Monotypic fish genera
Taxa named by George S. Myers